Brian Reginald Jeffries (born 1 October 1946) is a former English cricketer.  Jeffries was a right-handed batsman who bowled right-arm medium pace.  He was born in Oxford, Oxfordshire.

Jeffries made his debut for Oxfordshire in the 1970 Minor Counties Championship against Dorset.  Jeffries played Minor counties cricket for Oxfordshire from 1970 to 1980, which included 46 Minor Counties Championship matches.  He made his List A debut against Durham in the 1972 Gillette Cup.  He played 2 further List A matches for Oxfordshire, against Cornwall and Gloucestershire in the 1975 Gillette Cup.

Playing for Oxfordshire allowed him to represent the Minor Counties cricket teams.  He first played for Minor Counties South in the 1974 Benson & Hedges Cup against Glamorgan.  Jeffries played 5 further List A matches for Minor Counties South, the last coming against Middlesex in the 1975 Benson & Hedges Cup.  In addition, he played 2 List A matches for Minor Counties West in the 1978 Benson & Hedges Cup against Derbyshire and Lancashire.  In total, Jeffries played 11 List A matches.  In these he scored 107 runs at a batting average of 11.88, with a high score of 46.  With the ball, he took 10 wickets at a bowling average of 34.80, with best figures of 3/31.

References

External links
Brian Jeffries at ESPNcricinfo
Brian Jeffries at CricketArchive

1946 births
Living people
Cricketers from Oxford
English cricketers
Oxfordshire cricketers
Minor Counties cricketers